Desmond Kevin Armstrong (born November 2, 1964) is an American former soccer defender and midfielder, who was a member of the United States national team from 1987 to 1994. He played three seasons in the Major Indoor Soccer League, part of one in the Brazilian First Division, two in the American Professional Soccer League and two in USISL.

He is currently technical director of FC Columbus in the National Premier Soccer League. His son, Ezra, formerly played for Swope Park Rangers.

Player

Youth
Armstrong was born and raised in Washington, D.C.  Up until age 11, basketball was his main sport and he hadn't played soccer.  After an altercation with another boy on the basketball court, the boy's father, who was a youth soccer coach, invited Armstrong to come try out for his team. From that point on Armstrong moved into high school, college, and national team soccer. He attended Howard High School in Ellicott City, Maryland.  Armstrong's college career was spent at the University of Maryland, where he was first team All ACC in 1984 and 1985 and second team All ACC in 1983. He played in a total of 78 games for the university, tallying 24 goals and 18 assists.  In 1986, he was part of the Fairfax Spartans club which won the National Amateur Cup, defeating St. Louis Busch 3–0. The Spartans featured other national team players John Kerr, Bruce Murray and John Stollmeyer in addition to Armstrong.

Professional
Armstrong played two seasons for the Cleveland Force of the Major Indoor Soccer League (MISL) from 1986 to 1988. At the end of the 1987–1988 season, he transferred to the Baltimore Blast. However, on January 14, 1989, he broke his leg midway through the season. In February 1991, he signed with Santos of the Brazilian First Division making Armstrong the first American player ever to sign a professional contract in Brazil. Upon completing the season Armstrong returned to the U.S. with the  Maryland Bays, in the American Professional Soccer League. That year, the Bays made it to the league semifinals before falling to the Albany Capitals.  In 1995, he moved to the Washington Warthogs of the Continental Indoor Soccer League on loan from Major League Soccer as he was the fifth player signed to the new league. Armstrong decided to compete with the Charlotte Eagles of the United Soccer Leagues/ USISL  for the 1996 season opting out of his contract with Major League Soccer and later retiring from the game at the age of 31. That year he was selected to the USISL All Pro League Team.

National team
His first appearance for the United States national team came in 1987 in a match against Egypt. He was also a member of the Olympic team in the 1988 Summer Olympics in Seoul, South Korea. His performance with the Olympic team made him a mainstay on the national team through the early 1990s, playing in all three of the team's appearances at the 1990 FIFA World Cup. He made a total of 81 appearances for the national team, though he never scored a goal at this level.

Armstrong was the first U.S.-born African American player to represent the nation at the World Cup.

Coach
Since his retirement from international soccer, he has remained active in coaching and community initiatives. He has spent time organizing for inner-city Christian Ministries programs such as Soccer Beats (now Heroes FA) Also now owning a team based out of Murfreesboro Tennessee Legacy Heros FC. With a new entrance into Pioneer Premier League 2, Led By Luis A. In the mid-1990s he coached the USA Hurricanes club level soccer team in Charlotte, NC. In 1999, he became the head coach of the Montreat College Cavaliers in Montreat, North Carolina which play in the NAIA. He remained in this position until his retirement in 2006. Armstrong also coached the youth team '85 HFC Vipers of Asheville, North Carolina from 2000 to 2004. After leaving Montreat, Armstrong joined the youth club, Bethesda Roadrunners, as its head coach.  He also created another section of Heroes FA, in Maryland and is currently their head coach and technical director. He is also the Director of Recruiting in Ohio for Brad Friedel's Premier Soccer Academies.  He was named technical director of Rocket City United on December 11, 2009.

In 2012, he created the Heroes Soccer Club in Nashville, Tennessee. , the youth soccer club has 550 players and plays in several venues in the Nashville area.

Broadcaster
Armstrong has worked for ABC Sports. During the 1994 FIFA World Cup, Armstrong was an ESPN studio analyst.  Armstrong provided commentary for all Cleveland City Stars home games. The games will be aired on SportsTime Ohio. The City Stars play in the USL First Division.

On May 11, 2007, he was inducted into the Maryland Soccer Hall of Fame.

On February 29, 2012, he was inducted to the National Soccer Hall of Fame.

References

External links 
USA Soccer players.com
Montreat College
MISL stats

1964 births
Living people
1990 FIFA World Cup players
1991 CONCACAF Gold Cup players
1993 Copa América players
1993 CONCACAF Gold Cup players
CONCACAF Gold Cup-winning players
African-American soccer players
American expatriate soccer players
American expatriate sportspeople in Brazil
American Professional Soccer League players
American soccer coaches
American soccer players
Baltimore Blast (1980–1992) players
Charlotte Eagles players
Cleveland Force (original MISL) players
Continental Indoor Soccer League players
Expatriate footballers in Brazil
Association football commentators
Association football defenders
Association football midfielders
Footballers at the 1988 Summer Olympics
Major Indoor Soccer League (1978–1992) players
Maryland Bays players
Maryland Terrapins men's soccer players
National Premier Soccer League coaches
Olympic soccer players of the United States
Santos FC players
Soccer players from Washington, D.C.
USISL players
USL Second Division players
United States men's international soccer players
University of Maryland, College Park alumni
Washington Warthogs players
National Soccer Hall of Fame members
21st-century African-American people
20th-century African-American sportspeople